is a 1975 Japanese erotic horror film directed by Kazuhiko Yamaguchi.

Cast
 Naomi Tani as Yukino
 Misa Ohara as Mayumi, Yukino's sister
 Taiji Tonoyama as Genzō Kakinuma, bathhouse manager
 Tomoko Mayama as Utae Kakinuma, Genzō's second wife
 Terumi Azuma as Natsuyo Kakinuma, Genzō's daughter
 Kōji Fujiyama as Toriyama, bathhouse manager
 Sami Suzuki as Saburō, bathhouse manager
 Shingo Yamashiro as Young Master

References

External links

Further reading
 

Japanese horror films
1975 films
Films directed by Kazuhiko Yamaguchi
1975 horror films
1970s Japanese films